The Glasflügel 604 is a high-wing, T-tailed, single seat, FAI Open Class glider that was designed and produced in West Germany by Glasflügel starting in 1970.

Developed from the Kestrel 17, the 604 is often erroneously called a Kestrel 22 despite the company never giving it a formal name beyond its number designation.

Design and development
The 604 was originally intended as a test aircraft for a proposed two-seat glider that was never built. The prototype did so well in competition that a ten-aircraft production run was completed, resulting in a total of eleven 604s being completed.

The wing centre section alone weighs , requiring a large crew in order to rig it for flight.

The 604 is constructed from fibreglass. The wing employs a modified Wortmann FX 67-K-170 airfoil at the wing root, changing to a Wortmann FX 67-K-150 at the wing tip. The wing features six flaps, with the outer pair moving at a 2:1 differential ratio with the ailerons. For glidepath control, the 604 has wing top-surface spoilers and a tail-mounted drag chute. The aircraft can carry  of water ballast. The landing gear is a retractable monowheel.

Operational history

The 604 prototype, flown by Walter Neubert, came in sixth in the 1970 World Gliding Championships held at Marfa, Texas, even though the pilot was lost overnight after a land-out during the competition and missed the following day. A 604 came second in the Open Class at the 1974 World Championships held at Waikerie, South Australia. The aircraft also set several world records between 1970 and 1974.

In July 2011, five of the eleven 604s built were located in the United States and registered with the Federal Aviation Administration in the Experimental - Racing/Exhibition category.

Specifications (604)

See also

References

External links

 Photo of a 604 in flight
 Photo of a 604 in flight

1970s German sailplanes
Glasflügel aircraft
T-tail aircraft
Aircraft first flown in 1970